Cochabamba District (Quechua: Quchapampa, qucha means "lake" and pampa means "plain") is one of four districts of the province Huacaybamba in Peru.

Ethnic groups 
The people in the district are mainly indigenous citizens of Quechua descent. Quechua is the language which the majority of the population (50.29%) learned to speak in childhood, 49.12% of the residents started speaking using the Spanish language (2007 Peru Census).

See also 
 Hatun Hirka
 Kinwaqucha
 Puchkayuq

References